In legal history, an animal trial was the criminal trial of a non-human animal. Such trials are recorded as having taken place in Europe from the thirteenth century until the eighteenth. In modern times, it is considered in most criminal justice systems that non-human persons lack moral agency and so cannot be held culpable for an act.

Historical animal trials 
Animals, including insects, faced the possibility of criminal charges for several centuries across many parts of Europe. The earliest extant record of an animal trial is often assumed to be found in the execution of a pig in 1266 at Fontenay-aux-Roses. Newer research, however, suggests that this reading might be mistaken and no trial took place in that particular incident. Notwithstanding this controversy, such trials remained part of several legal systems until the 18th century. Animal defendants appeared before both church and secular courts, and the offences alleged against them ranged from murder to criminal damage. Human witnesses were often heard, and in ecclesiastical courts the animals were routinely provided with lawyers (this was not the case in secular courts, but for most of the period concerned, neither were human defendants). If convicted, it was usual for an animal to be executed or exiled. However, in 1750, a female donkey was acquitted of charges of bestiality due to witnesses to the animal's virtue and good behaviour while her co-accused human was sentenced to death.

Translations of several of the most detailed records can be found in E. P. Evans' The Criminal Prosecution and Capital Punishment of Animals, published in 1906. The text alludes to research such as that carried out by Karl Von Amira, who deals with the matter from a jurisprudential approach to the work "Consilia" made by the lawyer Bartholomew Chassenée, defender of animals and constantly called to represent animals in the trials held. Thanks to Evans' research and analysis of the sources indicated, with special reference to Von Amira, a division of the types of processes carried out can be made between Thierstrafen ("animal punishment"), and Thierprocesse ("animal trial"). Sadakat Kadri's The Trial: Four Thousand Years of Courtroom Drama (Random House, 2006) contains another detailed examination of the subject. Kadri shows that the trials were part of a broader state of affairs, with prosecutions of corpses and inanimate objects, and argues that an echo of such rituals survives in modern attitudes towards the punishment of children and the mentally ill.

Punishments of animals 
There were trials of animals accused of killing humans; the criminal procedure had some similarities with trials of humans: they had to be arrested and go through a trial hearing held by the secular court. If found guilty of homicide, the animal might suffer the death penalty.

The animals that were most often punished by Thierstrafen were pigs. The work of Evans and Cohen is used in jurisprudence about the animal abuse that is currently debated in Supreme Courts like the Constitutional Court of Colombia, institution that have cited this compilations of animal trials to debate about the animals capacity and the possibility to be subjects of law.

In the same way, it is through the trials of pigs that not only the direct author of the crime is recognized, but there could also be "accomplices", as in the case of the village of Saint-Marcel-le-Jeussey in 1379, in which two herds of these animals were said to have rioted and expressed the approval of an infanticide committed by other pigs; although the pigs found guilty of homicide were sentenced to execution, thanks to the request of the owner of the two herds to the Duke of Burgundy, the animals accused of complicity were pardoned.

In addition, there are also convictions of animals such as donkeys, horses, cows, bulls and mules.

Types of animals put on trial 

Animals put on trial were almost invariably either domesticated ones (most often pigs, but also bulls, horses, and cows) or pests such as rats and weevils.

Basel case 
According to Johannis Gross in Kurze Basler Chronik (1624), in 1474 a rooster was put on trial in the city of Basel for "the heinous and unnatural crime of laying an egg", which the townspeople were concerned was spawned by Satan and contained a cockatrice.

Katya the Bear 
Katya the Bear is a female brown bear native to Kazakhstan who was imprisoned in 2004 after being found guilty of mauling two people in separate incidents. Katya was held in the Arkalyk Prison in Kostanay. The bear was released from imprisonment and allowed to congregate with other bears after serving a fifteen-year sentence. Handlers report Katya socializing well with other bears after her long imprisonment.

Monkeys 
In September 2015, People for the Ethical Treatment of Animals sued David Slater on behalf of a monkey named Naruto. The judge dismissed the case, ruling that the monkey did not have legal standing. PETA later appealed the ruling, and the appeal was rejected on April 23, 2018.

According to local folklore, a monkey was hanged in Hartlepool, England. During the Napoleonic Wars, a French ship was wrecked in a storm off the coast of Hartlepool. The only survivor from the ship was a monkey, allegedly dressed in a French army uniform to provide amusement for the crew. On finding the monkey on the beach, some locals decided to hold an impromptu trial; since the monkey was unable to answer their questions and because they had seen neither a monkey nor a Frenchman before, they concluded that the monkey must be a French spy. Being found guilty, the animal was sentenced to death and was hanged on the beach. The colloquial name for the resident people of Hartlepool is "monkey hanger".

Ferron case 
Jacques Ferron was a Frenchman who was tried and hanged in 1750 for copulation with a jenny (female donkey). The trial took place in the commune of Vanves and Ferron was found guilty and sentenced to death by hanging. In cases such as these it was usual that the animal would also be sentenced to death, but in this case the she-ass was acquitted. The court decided that the animal was a victim and had not participated of her own free will. A document, dated 19 September 1750, was submitted to the court on behalf of the she-ass that attested to the virtuous nature of the animal. Signed by the parish priest and other principal residents of the commune it proclaimed that "they were willing to bear witness that she is in word and deed and in all her habits of life a most honest creature."

Proceedings against animals 
In contrast to the ease of capturing an animal such as those indicated above, animal trials also sought to condemn pests for killing crops, in order to expel them. The ecclesiastical tribunal had to resort to other types of questions and techniques to judge them, so they requested the intervention of the church to begin with the pertinent metaphysical actions, such as exorcisms and incantations having as their main element the holy water.

Evans collects several techniques of conjuration used against the plague: the author mentions a treatise by Kassianos Bassos, a Byzantine Bithynian who lived during the tenth century, in which he describes, step by step, a recipe to finish off the field mice, who are asked to leave the fields on pain of cutting them into seven pieces.

It is found that the animals most judged through this kind of process were rats, locusts, mice, snails, weevils, flies, bumblebees, caterpillars and other kinds of insects or "vermin" that attacked crops or vineyards, according to the explanations of the church for "instigation of Satan".

Evans' compilation covers trials from the 8th century until the early 20th century. He does not merely list them, but delves into the metaphysical, religious, legal and legislative issues that led humans to make judgments against animals.

The insects' advocate 
When an animal was accused of committing a crime against a human being or against his property, he was notified and assigned a lawyer to defend him during the trial. The Israeli academic Esther Cohen remarked on the advocate role when an animal was called to trial, who constantly used procedural figures to exempt the possibility of continuing with the process, as an example of the objection for lack of jurisdiction, since the animals could not commit crimes as they were incapable before the law. Another option for the defense was to argue that the notification was not made in accordance with the law, since they were directed directly against locusts, rats or other insects, who did not have the will, much less the possibility of making use of reason to appear at a trial. The trials and arguments of the defense sometimes alluded to the role of animals in the world according to teleology, such is the case of Thomas Aquinas, who indicated that there should not be such judgments because the animals were creations of God and in this sense if an earthly judge accused them of committing crimes they were going against the divine will.

In popular culture 
 In Lewis Carroll's humorous 1876 poem The Hunting of the Snark, the Barrister dreams about the trial of a pig accused of deserting its sty. In the musical adaptation this features as the song The Pig Must Die.
 Julian Barnes describes a trial against a woodworm in his 1989 book A History of the World in 10½ Chapters.
 The 1993 film The Hour of the Pig, released as The Advocate in the United States, centers on the prosecution of a homicidal pig. Several episodes reflect historical events, and its scriptwriters evidently consulted actual trial transcripts, though the plot revolves around a historical conceit – Colin Firth plays the pig's defence lawyer, but there is no recorded instance of a lawyer representing an animal charged with murder. (There are several cases, by contrast, where lawyers appeared for creatures in ecclesiastical courts – and several rats and beetles, for example, won famous court victories as a result.)
 In Olga Tokarczuk's 2009 novel Drive Your Plow Over the Bones of the Dead, the main protagonist writes to police using historical examples of animal trials to justify her theory that animals are responsible for recent local murders.
 The 2013 visual novel adventure video game Phoenix Wright: Ace Attorney – Dual Destinies offers an additional court case as downloadable content, where the protagonist defends an orca accused of murder.

See also

 Cadaver Synod
 Damnatio ad bestias
 Topsy (elephant)
 Mary (elephant)
 Tyke (elephant)

Notes

References 
 .
 .

External links
 The Criminal Prosecution and Capital Punishment of Animals (1906) at the Internet Archive
  , Society and Animals, Volume 2, Number 1 (1994)
   (2003)
 Nicholas Humphrey,  , Chapter 18 of The Mind Made Flesh, pp. 235–254, Oxford University Press (2002)
 Animals on Trial (MP3), BBC World Service documentary podcast, broadcast on 15 March 2011
 Bugs and Beast Before the Law in The Public Domain Review

Animal law
History of criminal justice
Types of trials